Barbora Chudíková (born 1978) is a Czech ski-orienteering competitor. She won a silver medal in the long distance at the 2009 World Ski Orienteering Championships, and a bronze medal in the relay (with Helena Randáková and Simona Karochová).

See also
 Czech orienteers
 List of orienteers
 List of orienteering events

References

1978 births
Czech orienteers
Female orienteers
Ski-orienteers
Living people
21st-century Czech women